Meniida is a former municipality in the Pella regional unit, Greece. Since the 2011 local government reform it is part of the municipality Skydra, of which it is a municipal unit. The municipal unit has an area of 118.562 km2. Population 4,575 (2011). The seat of the municipality was in Kali.

Subdivisions
Division of the municipal unit Meniida with total population 4,575 (2011). The 6 communities of Meniida are:

Historical Population

References

Populated places in Pella (regional unit)